Sir John de Fonblanque Pennefather, 1st Baronet, JP (29 March 1856 – 8 August 1933), was a British cotton merchant and Conservative politician.

Pennefather was born at Perth, Western Australia, the son of Kingsmill Pennefather by his second wife Jane Catherine Patricia de Grenier de Fonblanque, eldest daughter of Thomas de Grenier de Fonblanque, British Consul-General and chargé d'affaires in Serbia and Joan Catherine Barrington, and granddaughter of Sir Jonah Barrington. He was returned to Parliament for Kirkdale division of Liverpool at a by-election in February 1915, and held the seat until he stood down from the House of Commons at the 1929 general election.

In 1923 he adopted the first name of John, and in 1924 he was created a Baronet, of Golden in the County of Tipperary. He was also a Justice of the Peace for Hertfordshire.

Pennefather married Madeline Emily Melesina Stewart, daughter of Sir Robert Prescott Stewart on 28 April 1886. They had no children. He died on 8 August 1933, aged 77, at which time the baronetcy became extinct.

References

External links

 

1856 births
1933 deaths
Baronets in the Baronetage of the United Kingdom
UK MPs 1910–1918
UK MPs 1918–1922
UK MPs 1922–1923
UK MPs 1923–1924
UK MPs 1924–1929
Conservative Party (UK) MPs for English constituencies
Politicians from Perth, Western Australia
Australian emigrants to the United Kingdom
Australian people of British descent